Diphosphorus tetroxide,  or phosphorus tetroxide is an inorganic compound of phosphorus and oxygen. It has the empirical chemical formula . Solid phosphorus tetroxide (also referred to as phosphorus(III,V)-oxide) consists of variable mixtures of the mixed-valence oxides P4O7, P4O8 and P4O9.

Preparation 
Phosphorus tetroxide can be produced by thermal decomposition of phosphorus trioxide, which disproportionates above 210 °C to form phosphorus tetroxide, with elemental phosphorus as a byproduct:

8P2O3 <=> P4 + 6P2O4 

In addition, phosphorus trioxide can be converted into phosphorus tetroxide by controlled oxidation with oxygen in carbon tetrachloride solution.

Careful reduction of phosphorus pentoxide with red phosphorus at 450-525 °C also produces phosphorus tetroxide.

References 

Phosphorus oxides
Solids